Coalescence  is an album by American-born, British-based trumpeter Andre Canniere. It was released on Whirlwind Recordings on 28 October 2013.

Track list
 Sweden Hill
 Gibbs and East
 Nylon
 Gaslands
 Zuid Intro
 Zuid
 Parallax
 Point Zero
 Elk Run

Credits
 Andre Canniere - Trumpet
 Ivo Neame - Piano, Accordion
 Hannes Riepler - Guitar
 Ryan Trebilcock - Double Bass
 Jon Scott - Drums
 Recorded March 2013 in London at Red Gables Studio by Dick Hammett
 Edited by Alex Bonney
 Mixed & Mastered by Tyler McDiarmid
 Produced by Michael Janisch & Andre Canniere
 Executive Producer - Michael Janisch

References

2013 albums
Andre Canniere albums